St Luke's Church is on Liverpool Road, near the centre of Great Crosby, Sefton, Merseyside, England.  It is an active Anglican parish church in the diocese of Liverpool.  The church is recorded in the National Heritage List for England as a designated Grade II listed building.  The east end of the church was rebuilt following a fire in 1972.

History

St Luke's Church was built in 1853–54 and designed by A. and G. Holme.  The foundation stone was laid by John Myers, a benefactor of the church, in 1853, and the church was consecrated on 26 December of that year by the Rt Revd John Graham, bishop of Chester.  In 1864 a clock by Thomas Cooke, and a ring of six bells by Mears Whitechapel Foundry were installed in the tower. A new baptistry was created in 1888, when the font was moved to the back of the church, the choir stalls were moved into the chancel, and a new lectern was provided.  Further alterations were made to the front of the church in 1969.  On the evening of 9 June 1972 the east end of the church was badly damaged by fire.  It was rebuilt by Saunders Boston, who added a new steel roof, a new apse, and three new vestries in the Modernist style.  The rebuilt church was dedicated on 13 April 1975 the Rt Revd John Bickersteth, bishop of Warrington.

Architecture

Exterior
The church is built in coursed sandstone rubble with freestone dressings and a steel roof. Its architectural style is Decorated. The plan consists of a wide four-bay nave without aisles, a south porch, north and south two-bay transepts, a chancel, and a west steeple. This has a three-stage tower with full-height diagonal buttresses, and a single-stage circular stair turret. On the west side of the tower, the bottom stage contains an arched doorway with a hood mould, in the middle stage there is a three-light window, and in the top stage are a clock face on the west side and two-light louvred bell openings on all sides. On top of the tower is a broach spire, which is swept at the foot. The bays of the nave and the transepts contain two-light arched windows. Extending from the apse of the chancel are the three vestries added by Saunders Boston.

Interior
Inside the church, the box pews that had been damaged in the fire were replaced by pitch pine pews moved from St Benedict's Church, Everton, which has been demolished. The holy table and credence table survived the fire; they had been coated with a fire-proofing substance. On the front of the gallery is a royal coat of arms of William IV. The stained glass in the windows of the transepts was restored after the fire. Most of these windows are by Capronnier, and they depict biblical scenes. The glass in the windows of the nave is plain. The two-manual pipe organ was made by Walker's, and dates from the 1970s.

Appraisal

The church was designated as a Grade II listed building on 20 December 1996.  Grade II is the lowest of the three grades of listing and is applied to buildings that are "nationally important and of special interest".

Present day

St Luke's is an active parish church in the deanery of Sefton, the archdeaconry of Liverpool, and the diocese of Liverpool.  Services are held on Sundays, and at the 11 am service special activities are arranged for children.

See also

Listed buildings in Great Crosby

References

Church of England church buildings in Merseyside
Grade II listed churches in Merseyside
Saint Lukes Church, Great Crosby
Gothic Revival church buildings in England
Gothic Revival architecture in Merseyside
Anglican Diocese of Liverpool